Bertram Allen (born 1 August 1995) is an Irish show jumping rider. Originally from Wexford, he has won international medals at the pony, junior, and senior level. He won the opening round of the 2014 World Equestrian Games in Normandy at age 19, receiving international recognition. Allen is the youngest winner of a Grand Prix on the Longines Global Champions Tour, and was a team gold medalist at the 2017 European Championship in Gothenburg.

He runs his Ballywalter Stables in Hünxe with his sister, April, who manages the operation. Allen has been based in Germany since 2011. 

Bertram has a much wider family through his granddad Thomas Allen. Thomas has a brother Desmond, a sister Geraldine and another sister Mary. Desmond has 2 daughters 2 sons (Bertram’s Cousins) and  4 Grandchildren. His 2 daughters were very into horse riding just like Bertram but the boys not so much. His 2 sons one a pilot and the other a music producer both have two children both with one girl and one boy. Derek Allen (The Pilot) has a child called Kathrine and another Cillian and lives in America. And Carl Allen (The Music producer) has 2 children Katie and Marc. Although Carl and Derek have children the two ladies do not. Mary and Geraldine didn’t have any kids but certainly treated Bertram and the rest of there grandchildren like there own.

Early life and career 

Allen and his six siblings grew up with a strong equestrian influence, since their father owned and developed racehorses. Allen began riding at a local stable, and soon began competing. He then trained with Mag and Con Power; the helped him join Billy Twomey, who has influenced Allen's career.

He had successfully competed on ponies, winning every championship at the Dublin Horse Show and individual gold and team silver medals at the European Championships on Bishop Burton in the pony jumper classes in 2010. Allen competed on horses as a juniors, winning a team gold medal with Wild Thing L in 2012 and an individual silver medal with Molly Malone V in 2013. Twomey found Allen's early horses, Romanov, Molly Malone V and Wild Thing L, on whom he was successful.

At age 15, Allen moved to Hünxe. He rode his first senior competitions at age 17, where he jumped a double clear round in his first Nations Cup. Allen was  introduced to Marcus Ehning (whose stable is 20 minutes away from Allen's) around this time, and Ehning became Allen's trainer.

Professional career 
Allen was successful early on the senior international level. At age 18 he won the opening speed round of the 2014 World Equestrian Games in Normandy, finishing seventh overall. Allen finished third overall at the World Cup Jumping Finals in Las Vegas; both were on Molly Malone V. He won the 2014 Dublin Grand Prix on Molly Malone V, and was a member of the Irish Nations Cup team at Dublin (on Romanov) which won the Aga Khan Trophy. Allen is also the youngest rider to win a 5* Grand Prix on the Global Champions Tour, in Paris in 2015.

Allen was not chosen for the 2016 Olympic Games in Rio de Janeiro, despite winning the Irish individual spot; Greg Broderick and MHS Going Global were selected instead. Broderick was ranked 252nd in the world, and Allen was ranked in the top ten. Allen had top placings throughout the year, however, including 5* competitions in Mexico City, Madrid, Hamburg, Hong Kong and Paris.

He was on the gold medal-winning Irish team at the 2017 European Championships with Hector van d'Abdijhoeve, despite a fall during the competition. Allen won the 5* Grand Prix in St. Gallen on Hector van d'Abdijhoeve, in addition to 5* wins in Doha, Mexico City, Hamburg, Helsinki, Olympia London Olympia and at the Dutch Masters. He continued competing at a high level in 2018, riding for the Global Champions League team Valkenswaard United (which finished second in the league playoffs). Allen purchased Harley vd Bisschop (a stallion formerly ridden by Nicola Philippaerts) in October of that year, selling Hector van d'Abdijhoeve ro Denis Lynch in January 2019. He and GK Caspar won the World Cup Qualifier at the Royal Agricultural Winter Fair in Toronto, and had several wins in 2020 before the season was halted due to the COVID-19 pandemic. That year, Allen's horses included GK Casper, Lafayette Van Overis, Harley vd Bisschop, Gun Powder, Quiet Easy 4, Go To Fortuna and Pacino Amerio.

Major results

References

External links
 
 
 
 

1995 births
Living people
Irish show jumping riders
Irish male equestrians
Equestrians at the 2020 Summer Olympics
Olympic equestrians of Ireland